The 41st People's Choice Awards, honoring the best in popular culture for 2014, were held January 7, 2015, at the Nokia Theatre in Los Angeles, California, and were broadcast live on CBS at 9:00 pm EST. The ceremony was hosted by Anna Faris and Allison Janney. Nominations were announced on November 4, 2014.

Shailene Woodley led the movie nominees with four, including Favorite Movie Duo, in which she was nominated twice for her films Divergent and The Fault in Our Stars. In the television categories, Grey's Anatomy, Supernatural and The Vampire Diaries led the nominees with five each. Sam Smith had four music nominations. The Favorite Alternative Band category was omitted in this ceremony, though it, along with the Favorite Rock Band category, may return next year.

Performances
Lady Antebellum – "Freestyle"
Fall Out Boy – "Centuries"
Iggy Azalea – "Beg for It"

Presenters

Kaley Cuoco
Josh Gad
Kevin Hart
Dax Shepard
Anthony Anderson
Olivia Munn
Monica Potter
Katharine McPhee
The Band Perry
Ellen DeGeneres
Beth Behrs
Kat Dennings
Patricia Arquette
Thomas Lennon

Cote de Pablo
Lisa Edelstein
Dave Annable
Amy Adams
Kevin Connolly
Adrian Grenier
Jerry Ferrara
Gabrielle Union
Portia de Rossi
Bellamy Young
Sarah Hyland
Ginnifer Goodwin
Gina Rodriguez
Rainn Wilson

Winners
The full list of nominees and winners are as follows:

Movies

Television

Music

References

External links
 List of nominees at People's Choice Awards

People's Choice Awards
2014 awards
2015 in American television
2015 in Los Angeles
January 2015 events in the United States